Alexander Zavyalov (born October 28, 1969) is a Russian and Soviet former professional ice hockey defenceman. He is a one-time Russian Champion.

Awards and honors

References

External links
 

1969 births
Living people
Ak Bars Kazan players
SKA Saint Petersburg players
Torpedo Nizhny Novgorod players
HC Yugra players
Russian ice hockey defencemen